Coal Island is an island in Fiordland, in the southwest of New Zealand's South Island.
Its Māori name is Te Puka-Hereka Island, which translated means The Tied Anchor, but the island is commonly known as Coal Island.
Situated at the southern end of Fiordland's west coast, Coal Island lies in the entrance to Rakituma / Preservation Inlet, between Puysegur Point and Gulches Head.

The island is part of the Fiordland National Park and is an important conservation site.  It was declared pest-free in 2005 and is one of only nine islands in the area that is completely free of introduced mammalian pests.  Since then, endangered endemic birds such as tokoeka (Haast brown kiwi) and mōhua (yellowhead) have been released on the island.

See also

 Desert island
 List of islands

References

External links
Radio NZ interview about how Coal Island became predator free

Uninhabited islands of New Zealand
Islands of Fiordland
Fiordland National Park